Basmath is one of the 288 constituencies of the Maharashtra Legislative Assembly, in Maharashtra, India.

Overview
Basmath (constituency number 92) is one of the three Vidhan Sabha constituencies located in Hingoli district. It covers the entire Basmath tehsil and part of Aundha tehsil of this district.

Basmath is part of the Hingoli Lok Sabha constituency along with five other Vidhan Sabha segments, namely Kalamnuri and Hingoli in Hingoli district and Umarkhed in Yavatmal district , Kinwat and Hadgaon in Nanded district.

Members of Legislative assembly

Election results

Vidhan Sabha 2009

Vidhan Sabha 2014

See also
Basmath
List of constituencies of Maharashtra Vidhan Sabha

References

Assembly constituencies of Maharashtra
Hingoli district